Spacecraft electric propulsion (or just electric propulsion) is a type of spacecraft propulsion technique that uses electrostatic or electromagnetic fields to accelerate mass to high speed and thus generate thrust to modify the velocity of a spacecraft in orbit. The propulsion system is controlled by power electronics.

Electric thrusters typically use much less propellant than chemical rockets because they have a higher exhaust speed (operate at a higher specific impulse) than chemical rockets. Due to limited electric power the thrust is much weaker compared to chemical rockets, but electric propulsion can provide thrust for a longer time. 

Electric propulsion was first successfully demonstrated by NASA and is now a mature and widely used technology on spacecraft. American and Russian satellites have used electric propulsion for decades. , over 500 spacecraft operated throughout the Solar System use electric propulsion for station keeping, orbit raising, or primary propulsion. An electric rocket with an external power source (transmissible through laser on the photovoltaic panels) has a theoretical possibility for interstellar flight. However, electric propulsion is not suitable for launches from the Earth's surface, as it offers too little thrust.

On a journey to Mars, an electrically powered ship might be able to carry 70% of its initial mass to the destination, while a chemical rocket could carry only a few percent.

History
The idea of electric propulsion for spacecraft was introduced in 1911 by Konstantin Tsiolkovsky. Earlier, Robert Goddard had noted such a possibility in his personal notebook.

On 15 May 1929, the Soviet research laboratory Gas Dynamics Laboratory (GDL) commenced development of electric rocket engines. Headed by Valentin Glushko, in the early 1930s he created the world's first example of an electrothermal rocket engine. This early work by GDL has been steadily carried on and electric rocket engines were used in the 1960s onboard the Voskhod 1 spacecraft and Zond-2 Venus probe.

Electrically powered propulsion with a nuclear reactor was considered by Tony Martin for interstellar Project Daedalus in 1973, but the approach was rejected because of its thrust profile, the weight of equipment needed to convert nuclear energy into electricity, and as a result a small acceleration, which would take a century to achieve the desired speed.

The first demonstration of electric propulsion was an ion engine carried on board the NASA SERT-1 (Space Electric Rocket Test) spacecraft. It launched on 20 July 1964 and operated for 31 minutes. A follow-up mission launched on 3 February 1970, SERT-2. It carried two ion thrusters, one operated for more than five months and the other for almost three months.

By the early 2010s, many satellite manufacturers were offering electric propulsion options on their satellites—mostly for on-orbit attitude control—while some commercial communication satellite operators were beginning to use them for geosynchronous orbit insertion in place of traditional chemical rocket engines.

Types

Ion and plasma drives
These types of rocket-like reaction engines use electric energy to obtain thrust from propellant. Unlike rocket engines, these kinds of engines do not require nozzles, and thus are not considered true rockets.

Electric propulsion thrusters for spacecraft may be grouped into three families based on the type of force used to accelerate the ions of the plasma:

Electrostatic

If the acceleration is caused mainly by the Coulomb force (i.e. application of a static electric field in the direction of the acceleration) the device is considered electrostatic. Types:

 Gridded ion thruster
 NASA Solar Technology Application Readiness (NSTAR)
 HiPEP
 Radiofrequency ion thruster
 Hall-effect thruster, including its subtypes Stationary Plasma Thruster (SPT) and Thruster with Anode Layer (TAL)
 Colloid ion thruster
 Field-emission electric propulsion
 Nano-particle field extraction thruster

Electrothermal
The electrothermal category groups devices that use electromagnetic fields to generate a plasma to increase the temperature of the bulk propellant. The thermal energy imparted to the propellant gas is then converted into kinetic energy by a nozzle of either solid material or magnetic fields. Low molecular weight gases (e.g. hydrogen, helium, ammonia) are preferred propellants for this kind of system.

An electrothermal engine uses a nozzle to convert heat into linear motion, so it is a true rocket even though the energy producing the heat comes from an external source.

Performance of electrothermal systems in terms of specific impulse (Isp) is 500 to ~1000 seconds, but exceeds that of cold gas thrusters, monopropellant rockets, and even most bipropellant rockets. In the USSR, electrothermal engines entered use in 1971; the Soviet "Meteor-3", "Meteor-Priroda", "Resurs-O" satellite series and the Russian "Elektro" satellite are equipped with them. Electrothermal systems by Aerojet (MR-510) are currently used on Lockheed Martin A2100 satellites using hydrazine as a propellant.

 Resistojet
 Arcjet
 Microwave
 Variable specific impulse magnetoplasma rocket (VASIMR)

Electromagnetic

Electromagnetic thrusters accelerate ions either by the Lorentz force or by the effect of electromagnetic fields where the electric field is not in the direction of the acceleration. Types:

 Electrodeless plasma thruster
 Magnetoplasmadynamic thruster
 Pulsed inductive thruster
 Pulsed plasma thruster 
 Helicon Double Layer Thruster

Non-ion drives

Photonic

A photonic drive interacts only with photons.

Electrodynamic tether

Electrodynamic tethers are long conducting wires, such as one deployed from a tether satellite, which can operate on electromagnetic principles as generators, by converting their kinetic energy to electric energy, or as motors, converting electric energy to kinetic energy. Electric potential is generated across a conductive tether by its motion through the Earth's magnetic field. The choice of the metal conductor to be used in an electrodynamic tether is determined by factors such as electrical conductivity, and density. Secondary factors, depending on the application, include cost, strength, and melting point.

Controversial
Some proposed propulsion methods apparently violate currently-understood laws of physics, including:
 Quantum Vacuum Thruster
 EM Drive or Cannae Drive

Steady vs. unsteady
Electric propulsion systems can be characterized as either steady (continuous firing for a prescribed duration) or unsteady (pulsed firings accumulating to a desired impulse). These classifications can be applied to all types of propulsion engines.

Dynamic properties

Electrically powered rocket engines provide lower thrust compared to chemical rockets by several orders of magnitude because of the limited electrical power available in a spacecraft. A chemical rocket imparts energy to the combustion products directly, whereas an electrical system requires several steps. However, the high velocity and lower reaction mass expended for the same thrust allows electric rockets to run on less fuel. This differs from the typical chemical-powered spacecraft, where the engines require more fuel, requiring the spacecraft to mostly follow an inertial trajectory. When near a planet, low-thrust propulsion may not offset the gravitational force. An electric rocket engine cannot provide enough thrust to lift the vehicle from a planet's surface, but a low thrust applied for a long interval can allow a spacecraft to manoeuvre near a planet.

See also
 Magnetic sail, a proposed system powered by solar wind from the Sun or any star
 List of spacecraft with electric propulsion, a list of past and proposed spacecraft which used electric propulsion

References

External links
NASA Jet Propulsion Laboratory
The technological and commercial expansion of electric propulsion - D. Lev et al. The technological and commercial expansion of electric propulsion
Electric (Ion) Propulsion, University Center for Atmospheric Research, University of Colorado at Boulder, 2000.
Distributed Power Architecture for Electric Propulsion
Choueiri, Edgar Y. (2009). New dawn of electric rocket
Robert G. Jahn and Edgar Y. Choueiri. Electric Propulsion
Colorado State University Electric Propulsion and Plasma Engineering (CEPPE) Laboratory
Stationary plasma thrusters(PDF)
electric space propulsion
Public Lessons Learned Entry: 0736
A Critical History of Electric Propulsion：The First Fifty Years (1906–1956) - AIAA-2004-3334
Aerospace America, AIAA publication, December 2005, Propulsion and Energy section, pp. 54–55, written by Mitchell Walker.

Russian inventions
Soviet inventions
Spacecraft propulsion
Electric motors 
Spaceflight articles needing attention